Banawa may refer to:

Banawá people, an ethnic group of Brazil
Banawa language, or Madi, a language of Brazil
Banawa, Indonesia, a town in Indonesia
 Banawa Tengah, a district
 Banawa Selatan, Donggala, a district
Carol Banawa (born 1981), US-based Filipino singer and actress

See also
Badnawar
Bakunawa
Bana Wala
Banaswadi
Banawadi
Banawali